Boxtown is a neighborhood in South Memphis, Tennessee. The neighborhood, which is near T.O. Fuller State Park, is also the oldest in South Memphis. Boxtown includes White's Chapel AME Church, which was built in 1890. Boxtown has numerous shotgun houses.

Boundaries
The main boundary of Boxtown is Sewanee Road, which is on the east.

History

Boxtown began as a community for emancipated slaves and freedmen slaves soon after the signing the Emancipation Proclamation in 1863, as it was a part of Shelby County on the south boundary of the Memphis city limits. Boxtown is so-named because the houses looked like boxcars, which were built from the trains.  Many opened grocery stores. The most notable grocer in Boxtown was S.L. Jones (1914–1991), who opened a grocery store at the corner of Sewanee Road and Fields Road. He later opened Jones Big Star on McLemore Avenue. On December 31, 1971, Boxtown has been annexed by the City of Memphis, due to an attempted 1968 annexation being rejected. Families like the Rogers family lived in the area for generations, as well as families like the White Family who the White's Chapel Church was named after.

References

 Meeks, Ann. Streetscapes, The Commercial Appeal 1988-2013.
 Gibson, Stephanie. Beautifully Abandoned, Flickr 2011-2014.

Neighborhoods in Memphis, Tennessee